Double Identity is a 2009 American crime thriller film directed by Dennis Dimster and starring Val Kilmer and Izabella Miko, originally titled Fake Identity. It was released in early 2010 on DVD and Blu-ray.

Plot
An American doctor, Dr. Nicholas Pinter (Val Kilmer), working in Bulgaria for Doctors Beyond Borders, is mistakenly identified as a secret agent by the Russian mob. He escapes a close brush with death and is then rescued by the British Secret Service and a beautiful but mysterious woman named Katrine (Izabella Miko). His life dramatically changes when he helps this mysterious woman escape from her would-be assailant.

Cast
 Val Kilmer as Dr. Nicholas Pinter \ John Charter
 Izabella Miko as Katrine
 Julian Wadham as Sterling
 Hristo Shopov as Serik Doulov
 Michael Cronin as Allen Jacob
 Valentine Pelka as Matthew Murdoch
 Valentin Ganev as Ludvik Seifert
 Rushi Vidinliev as Agent Finney
 Zahari Baharov as Alexander
 Velislav Pavlov as Aslan
 Emil Markov as Detective
 Stanislav Pishtalov as General Lebedev
 Yulian Vergov as Victor Krastev
 Jeremy Zimmerman as Agent Davies
 Yavor Baharov as Agent Bouquet
 Raicho Vasilev as George Walther
 Kenneth Hughes as Mr. Pimstone
 Asen Blatechki as Bodyguard
 Daniel Perrone as Dr. Paulo Ivanov
 Harry Anichkin as Minister Vadim Abilov
 Nickolay Hadjimenov as Malik Gelayev
 Vladimir Kolev as Interrogation Detective

References

External links
 
 

2009 films
American crime thriller films
Films set in 1992
2009 crime thriller films
Films shot in Bulgaria
Films set in Bulgaria
2000s English-language films
2000s American films